Hal Mohr, A.S.C. (August 2, 1894 in San Francisco – May 10, 1974 in Santa Monica, California) was a famed movie cinematographer who won an Oscar for his work on the 1935 film, A Midsummer Night's Dream. He was awarded another Oscar for The Phantom of the Opera in 1943, and received a nomination for The Four Poster in 1952.

Career 
From a young age, Hal Mohr wanted to pursue a career in cinematography because he was curious to learn about how to make pictures move onscreen. He worked as a photo finisher in a photo lab to gain experience with the camera. When he was 19 years old, he filmed his first movie, Pam's Daughter, which, unfortunately, was never seen by the public because of problems with the motion picture distribution company.

Mohr moved to Hollywood in 1915 and began working at Universal City to gain further experience in the industry. There,  he filmed The Jazz Singer in 1927 for Warner Brothers.

In 1915, in an early example of an exploitation film peddled directly to theater owners, Mohr and Sol Lesser produced and directed a film The Last Night of the Barbary Coast. This film purported to show the last night of the depraved Barbary Coast red-light district of San Francisco before it was shut down by the police. (The area was not actually closed down until 1917.) This is now considered a lost film.

Although Mohr mainly worked as a cinema portraitist on movies such as The Wedding March, A Midsummer Night's Dream, and the Technicolor The Phantom of the Opera, he was passionate about exploring the limits of the camera. Mohr shot in deep focus years before Gregg Toland – Bullets or Ballots and The Green Pastures were both shot in deep focus.

He was inspired by the moving shots in the Italian movie, Cabiria, and developed a camera with special tracking abilities for his 1914 film, Pan's Mountain.

Notably, Mohr is the only person to have won a competitive Academy Award without being nominated for it. In 1936, a write-in campaign won him the Best Cinematography Oscar for his work on A Midsummer Night's Dream (1935). The Academy later changed the Oscar rules, making write-in voting impossible. In 1944, Mohr became the first person to win an Oscar for both Black-and-White and Color cinematography when he won his second Academy Award, this time with W. Howard Greene for Best Cinematography in a Color Film, for their work on The Phantom of the Opera (1943).

Mohr was nominated for an Academy Award for Best Cinematographer for his work on The Four Poster (1952), a film based on a play of the same name, written by Jan de Hartog.  He was also nominated for a Golden Globe for Best Cinematography in a Black and White Film, for his work on the same movie.

Other film cinematographer credits include Little Annie Rooney (1925), The Big Gamble (1931), Cheers for Miss Bishop (1941), Another Part of the Forest (1948) and The Wild One (1953).

Mohr served as president of the American Society of Cinematographers from 1930 to 1931. Then, for two terms from 1963 to 1965 and finally from 1969 to 1970. He was one of the first members of the Academy of Motion Picture Arts and Sciences, and a senior member of the Academy's Board of Directors. He headed the Academy's Cinematography Branch for over 20 years, and was also a part of the Academy of Television Arts and Sciences. Before his death, he would travel the country promoting cameramen and the industry of cinematography.

For his many contributions to motion pictures and the film industry, Hal Mohr received a star on the Hollywood Walk of Fame located at 6433 Hollywood Blvd.

Personal life 
On December 7, 1934, Mohr married actress Evelyn Venable, whom he met on the set of the Will Rogers film David Harum. Strict vegetarians, they had two daughters, Dolores and Rosalia, and the couple remained married until his death in 1974.

Awards and nominations 
 American Academy Awards (Oscars), 1936, Best Cinematography – A Midsummer Night's Dream (1935)
 American Academy Awards (Oscars), 1944, Best Cinematography – The Phantom of the Opera (1943)

Partial filmography 

 Bag and Baggage (1923)
 Vanity's Price (1924)
 The Monster (1925)
 Little Annie Rooney (1925)
 He Who Laughs Last (1925)
 Sparrows (1926)
 The High Hand (1926)
 Bitter Apples (1927)
 Old San Francisco (1927)
 The Jazz Singer (1927)
 The Girl from Chicago (1927)
 Tenderloin (1928)
 The Wedding March (1928)
 Broadway (1929)
 The Last Performance (1929)
 Captain of the Guard (1930)
 The Czar of Broadway (1930)
 Big Boy (1930)
 Outward Bound (1930)
 The Cat Creeps (1930)
 A Woman of Experience (1931)
 The Common Law (1931)
 The Big Gamble (1931)
 Devotion (1931)
 The Week Ends Only (1932)
 I Loved You Wednesday (1933)
 State Fair (1933)
 David Harum (1934)
 Carolina (1934)
 Under Pressure (1935)
 A Midsummer Night's Dream (1935)
 Captain Blood (1935)
 The Walking Dead (1936)
 Bullets or Ballots (1936)
 When Love Is Young (1937)
 The Green Pastures (1937)
 Destry Rides Again (1939)
 The Daltons Rode (1940)
 Cheers for Miss Bishop (1941)
 Pot o' Gold (1941)
 Phantom of the Opera (1943)
 Ladies Courageous (1944)
 San Diego, I Love You (1944)
 Because of Him (1946)
 The Lost Moment (1947)
 An Act of Murder (1948)
 Woman on the Run (1950)
 Rancho Notorious (1952)
 The Wild One (1953)
 Baby Faced Nelson (1957)
 The Lineup (1958)
 The Last Voyage (1959)
 Underworld U.S.A (1960)
 The Man from the Diners' Club (1963)
 The Bamboo Saucer (1968)
 Topaz (1969) (photographic consultant only)

References and bibliography 
 Petrie, Graham. "Paul Fejos in America." Film Quarterly (ARCHIVE), vol. 32, no. 2, 1979., pp. 28–37 
 "Hal Mohr, 'Jazz Singer' Cameraman." The Washington Post, 1974. 
 "Hal Mohr, 79; Filmed First Talking Movie." Boston Globe, 1974. 
 "A.S.C. MOURNS HAL MOHR." American Cinematographer, vol. 55, no. 6, 1974., pp. 680,  
 Koszarski, Richard. "HAL MOHR'S CINEMATOGRAPHY." Film Comment, vol. 10, no. 5, 1974., pp. 48–53,  
 Hal MOHR 
 "CAMERAMAN SAYS STAR IS SUPERB." The Washington Post, 1928. 
 Streible, Dan. "Hal Mohr." American National Biography. N.p., n.d. Web. 17 Nov. 2016.  http://www.anb.org/articles/18/18-02410.html

External links

See also 
 List of presidents of American Society of Cinematographers
 List of stars on the Hollywood Walk of Fame

American cinematographers
1894 births
1974 deaths
People from San Francisco
Best Cinematographer Academy Award winners